Jaane Hoga Kya is a 2006 Indian Hindi-language science fiction thriller film directed by Glen Barretto & Ankush Mohla. The film stars Aftab Shivdasani and Bipasha Basu, Rahul Dev, Paresh Rawal, Tinnu Anand and Preeti Jhangiani. The film which began production in 2003 was released on 1 September 2006 in India. It features Aftab in a double role, as a scientist who aims to clone human life.

Synopsis
Siddharth Sardesai (Aftab Shivdasani), is a gifted young scientist from the Indian Medical Research center who wants to create another human being, not in a mother's womb but in a science lab as a clone. 

If he is successful it could be a boon for humanity else it could be a doom for mankind. Siddharth has been experimenting with cloning for the past two years and has been unsuccessful. But he is now confident of succeeding. He needs permission from the Indian Medical Research Center and his Guru and father figure Dr. Krishnan (Paresh Rawal).

There are few people who don't approve of his experiment. Amongst them is Inspector Rathod. So Siddharth is shattered when Dr. Krishnan informs him that the permission to go ahead is not granted. Siddharth girlfriend, Aditi (Bipasha Basu) comforts him and suggests that she could speak to her father Mr. Chopra (Tinnu Anand) who is a big industrialist and could finance Siddharth's clone project to help him go ahead with his dream of creating a human clone. 

After careful thought and consideration, Siddharth agrees to take Aditi's help. He builds his own lab in an old burnt mill and starts his experiment. He first clones a mouse. Time is running out as Inspector Rathod (Rahul Dev) closes on to Siddharth's heels and ultimately Siddharth has to take a plunge and he begins to clone himself. 

He succeeds but his clone goes missing and all hell breaks loose when suddenly Siddharth is put behind bars for assaulting a girl at a Night Club. Siddharth realizes that it is his clone that is doing all this. But he is helpless, as no one believes him that he has cloned himself, not even Dr. Krishnan. The clone has other ideas. He wants to take over Siddharth's life and starts playing games. He flirts with Dr. Krishnan's daughter Suchitra who loves  Siddharth (Preeti Jhangiani) and even impregnates her. To obtain  Siddharth's project report, the clone kills Dr. Krishnan and the blame comes on Siddharth. Inspector Rathod gets furious and promises Siddharth that he will not let him go out alive from jail. Siddharth is in a major dilemma to prove his innocence of the crime that his clone has committed. Eventually, Siddharth is able to convince Inspector Rathod to believe him and works with him to prove his innocence. 

Siddharth soon discovers that Aditi is responsible for the clones evil personality and she deliberately helped Siddharth in order to destroy him. Aditi gave Siddharth finance to complete his project but gave the clone an evil personality so Siddharth life would be ruined. 

Aditi reveals her reason behind this is because she holds Siddharth responsible for the death of her brother Sanjay. Sanjay was Siddharth lab partner and dear friend who helped him develop the cloning process and his death lead to the death of Aditi mother and destruction of her family. A heartbroken Siddharth reveals that he only wished to honour Sanjay memory by completing the clone project. Siddharth confesses to Aditi that Sanjay volunteered to do the cloning process first despite Siddharth reservations and died due to the process failing. 

A shocked Aditi realises her mistake and urges Siddharth to escape, however the clone appears and murders Aditi. The clone escapes and Siddharth and Inspector Rathod confront the clone at his base and learn that he intends to build a clone army and conquer the world. 

After a long and arduous battle Siddharth and Inspector Rathod finally kill the clone and Siddharth destroys the clone's base to stop the clone army escaping. 

In the end Siddharth is cleared of all charges by the court who forbid him to continue any further research in cloning. Siddharth also marries Suchitra and agrees to raise the clone baby with her to atone for his actions.

Cast
Aftab Shivdasani as Siddharth Sardesai / Mannu Dada, the evil clone (dual role)
Bipasha Basu as  Aditi Chopra
Rahul Dev as  Officer Rathore
Paresh Rawal as Dr. Krishnan
Preeti Jhangiani as  Suchitra Krishnan
Tinu Anand	as Mr. Chopra
Zarina Wahab as Mrs. Krishnan

Soundtrack

Reception
Taran Adarsh of IndiaFM gave the film 1 star out of 5, writing ″Directors Glen-Ankush are technically proficient and it shows in several well-filmed sequences. But the directors ought to know that it's the content that does the talking eventually, not striking frames and visuals. Musically, nothing to hum about. Frankly, it's the filming of the songs that stays with you more than the tunes. Cinematography is first-rate.″

References

External links
Jaane Hoga Kya@ IndiaFM
 

2000s Hindi-language films
2006 films
Films scored by Nikhil-Vinay
Films scored by Sajid–Wajid
Indian science fiction thriller films
2000s science fiction thriller films